Priapulimorphida is the sole order within the Priapulimorpha, one of the three extant Priapulid classes.

References 

Priapulida
Protostome orders
Extant Pennsylvanian first appearances